The International Journal of Behavioral Development is a peer-reviewed academic journal that covers research in the field of developmental psychology. The journal's current editor-in-chief is Brett Laursen (Florida Atlantic University). It was established in 1978 and is currently published by SAGE Publications on behalf of International Society for the Study of Behavioural Development.

Abstracting and indexing 
International Journal of Behavioral Development is abstracted and indexed in Scopus and the Social Sciences Citation Index. According to the Journal Citation Reports, the journal has a 2018 impact factor of 2.015, ranking it 34th out of 74 journals in the category "Psychology, Developmental".

References

External links 
 
 International Society for the Study of Behavioural Development

SAGE Publishing academic journals
English-language journals
Developmental psychology journals
Publications established in 1978
Bimonthly journals